Antaeotricha murinella is a moth in the family Depressariidae. It was described by Francis Walker in 1864. It is found in Amazonas, Brazil.

Adults are mouse coloured, the forewings with a whitish oblique apical space extending from four-fifths of the length of the costa nearly to the hind end of the exterior border, and containing some cinereous points. The marginal points are black.

References

Moths described in 1864
murinella
Moths of South America